La Caravane is a Lucky Luke adventure written by Goscinny and illustrated by Morris. It was originally published in French  by Dupuis in 1964. English editions of this French series titled The Wagon Train have been published by Dargaud and Cinebook. The story was loosely adapted into the film Go West: A Lucky Luke Adventure.

Synopsis 
A caravan arrives at Nothing Gulch. The guide, Frank Malone, does not want to drive it further if he is not given $1000 more. He is prevented from shooting by Lucky Luke who was just stopping at Nothing Gulch. Andrew Boston, the leader of the caravan, manages to persuade him to take the place of Malone and become captain of the caravan.

While waiting for the departure, Luke meets the most eminent members of the caravan: Miss Littletown, Mr. Pierre, Ugly Barrow, Zachary Martins and others. Then it is the departure. From then on, weird events begin to happen. The day after departure, the wheel of a wagon is sawn off. The next day, the harness of Andrew Boston's horses is cut. The pioneers face the facts: there is a traitor in the caravan. When they arrive in the desert, all the water barrels of the carriages are pierced. Thanks to the tenacity of Lucky Luke, the caravan manages to cross anyway.

After a stop in Crazy Town (a city of vice and gambling that the women of the caravan burn before their men lose everything to cards), the expedition enters the territory of the Sioux. As soon as it arrives, the convoy of weapons explodes mysteriously. There are almost no more weapons to counter a possible Indian attack. The next night, a fire is lit in the camp while Lucky Luke had expressly forbidden it. The next day, Luke and Ugly Barrow catch a Sioux, Head of Calf, but he does not want to talk. During the next night, the mysterious saboteur frees him after knocking out Andrew Boston. The Indian immediately reports to his boss, Enraged Dog. The Sioux soon besiege the caravan and, after enjoying a hearty meal, the Sioux follow with a good sleep, the people of the caravan take the opportunity to besiege in turn the Indians. Enraged Dog decides to parley and promises to stop the war if Mr. Pierre, the French hairdresser, will hand over his 'scalps' - wigs.

On the eve of arriving in California, an impotent old woman disappears from the caravan. Lucky Luke guesses that this is Frank Malone disguised and that he is the saboteur of the expedition. He goes to meet him and the duel is won by Luke. In California, on the Pacific Rim, the pioneers celebrate the end of their journey.

Characters 

 The pioneers
 Ugly Barrow: Mule driver, expert in whip handling and coarse cursing
 Andrew Boston: Leader of the pioneer caravan, he convinces Lucky Luke to help them reach California
 Zachary Martin: Eccentric inventor who joins the caravan in Nothing Gulch
 Miss Littletown: Teacher who teaches in her school cart with the children of the convoy; she takes the lead of an expedition of pioneer women against a city of saloons
 Mr. Pierre: French hairdresser, always ready to practice his art; it will provide a lot of wigs and hairpieces so that Enraged Dog does not lose face
 The undertaker: A jovial character, his hearse will serve as guinea pig to the inventions of Zachary Martin, which opens a new vocation and develops a friendship.
 The Sioux
 Enraged Dog: Old leader of the tribe, whose ardor to lead the fight is not very lively
 Lazy Marmot: Encourages its leader to take a nap during the siege of the camp of the caravan
 Head of Calf: Watching the camp of the caravan, he is taken prisoner by Lucky Luke. Later, he loses a fight against Luke, who wins very easily thanks to his footwork.
 Frank Malone: Captain of the convoy until Nothing Gulch, he claims $1000 more from Boston; when he refuses the blackmail, he threatens him with his weapon but is disarmed by Lucky Luke; he will then try to sabotage the caravan's journey

External links
Lucky Luke official site album index 
Goscinny website on Lucky Luke

Comics by Morris (cartoonist)
Lucky Luke albums
1964 graphic novels
Works by René Goscinny